"Shake Your Love" (Atlantic 89187, Atlantic UK A9187) is the second single by American singer-songwriter-actress Debbie Gibson, and the lead off single for her debut album, Out of the Blue (1987) (LP 81780). Originally recorded in the spring of 1987, the song is written by Gibson and produced by Fred Zarr and engineered by Don Feinberg for BiZarr Music, Inc., with Douglas Breitbart as executive producer. It was released in September 1987 and reached No. 4 on the U.S. Billboard Hot 100 singles chart in December that year. It was her breakthrough single in the UK, reaching No. 7 in early 1988. 
Both tracks on the US-specification single also appeared among the six total tracks of the simultaneously released maxi-single (Atlantic DM 86651), which reached No. 1 on the Billboard Hot Maxi-Singles chart.

The music video to support this single, eventually included on Gibson's video album Out of the Blue (Atlantic VHS 50123) was set on a facsimile of a drive-in movie theater lot and choreographed by Paula Abdul.
 
In 2010, Gibson re-recorded the song as an extra track for the Deluxe Edition release of the Japan-exclusive album Ms. Vocalist. Also in 2010, the song was featured in Season 2, Episode 8 of Rupaul's Drag Race.

Track listing

Versions
"Shake Your Love" [LP Version] 3:38
"Shake Your Love" [Bass-Apella] 3:29
"Shake Your Love" [Prime Mix] 6:48
"Shake Your Love" [Vocal Club Version] 5:53
"Shake Your Love" [Bad Dub Version] 4:55
"Shake Your Love" [Vocal Bassapella] 3:25
"Shake Your Love" [Vocal LP Version] 3:37
"Shake Your Love" [Bonus Beats] 6:52
"Shake Your Love" [Vocal Club Mix] 5:53
"Shake Your Love" [Shake The House Version] 5:48
"Shake Your Love" [Video Version] 3:32

Charts

Weekly charts

Year-end charts

Certifications

References

External links
 

1987 singles
1987 songs
Debbie Gibson songs
Song recordings produced by Fred Zarr
Songs written by Debbie Gibson
Atlantic Records singles